
Ferrar Glacier is a glacier in Antarctica. The glacier makes a right (east) turn northeast of Knobhead, where it also feeds the upper end of the Taylor Glacier, which flows on the other (northern) side of the Kukri Hills from the Ferrar Glacier, which continues east along the south side of the Kukri Hills to New Harbour.

History 
Ferrar Glacier was discovered by the British National Antarctic Expedition, (1901–04) under Captain Robert Falcon Scott, who named this feature for Hartley T. Ferrar, geologist of the expedition. The name Ferrar Glacier was originally applied both to the part of this glacier below its right turn and to the present Taylor Glacier. Thomas Griffith Taylor, geologist of the British Antarctic Expedition, 1910–13, under Scott, found evidence that these are not two parts of a single glacier but are two glaciers apposed. With this discovery Scott gave the names Ferrar Glacier and Taylor Glacier essentially as now applied; the Taylor Glacier makes a left turn at Cavendish Rocks and drains east along the north side of the Kukri Hills.

See also
 Dun Glacier
 List of glaciers in the Antarctic
 Glaciology

References

External links
 

Royal Society Range
Glaciers of Scott Coast